The Gold Chignon (French:Chignon d'or) is a 1916 French silent film directed by André Hugon and starring Mistinguett and Harry Baur.

Cast
 Mistinguett as Mistinguett  
 Harry Baur as Harry

References

Bibliography
 Rège, Philippe. Encyclopedia of French Film Directors, Volume 1. Scarecrow Press, 2009.

External links

1916 films
Films directed by André Hugon
French silent feature films
French black-and-white films
1910s French films